Anita Wachter (born 12 February 1967) is a former World Cup alpine ski racer and Olympic gold medalist from Austria. She focused on the technical events and specialized in giant slalom.

Biography
Born in Bartholomäberg, Montafon, Vorarlberg, Wachter won the World Cup overall title in 1993, and the giant slalom title twice (1990 & 1994). She was the gold medalist in the combined at the 1988 Winter Olympics, and won two silver medals in 1992 (combined and giant slalom). Wachter also won five medals at the World Championships; she represented Austria in three Olympics and eight World Championships.

Wachter retired from competition after the 2001 season with 19 World Cup wins (14 Giant Slalom, 2 Super G, 1 Slalom, 2 Combined), attained 76 podiums, and had 175 top ten finishes. She is living together with her longtime companion Rainer Salzgeber; they have two daughters.

World Cup results

Season standings

Season titles
 1 Overall, 2 Giant Slalom

Race victories
 19 wins: (14 Giant Slalom, 2 Super G, 1 Slalom, 2 Combined)
 76 podiums

World Championship results

Olympic results

References

External links
 
 
 Mountain Zone.com – profile – Anita Wachter
 http://www.montafon.com/Anita-Wachter 

1967 births
Living people
Austrian female alpine skiers
Alpine skiers at the 1988 Winter Olympics
Alpine skiers at the 1992 Winter Olympics
Alpine skiers at the 1994 Winter Olympics
Olympic gold medalists for Austria
Olympic silver medalists for Austria
Olympic medalists in alpine skiing
FIS Alpine Ski World Cup champions
Medalists at the 1988 Winter Olympics
Medalists at the 1992 Winter Olympics
Olympic alpine skiers of Austria
Sportspeople from Vorarlberg